Florencia de Saracho (born December 4, 1981 in Hermosillo, Sonora) is a Mexican actress.

Biography
She began her career in the soap opera, Las vías del amor (2002) in the role of Pamela Fernandez. Then she joined the cast of Piel de otoño, in 2005, in a role with Alessandra Rosaldo. She was featured in the role of Liliana Mendoza in Sueños y Caramelos. In 2006, she was a contributor to teen telenovela Rebelde as Romina and appeared in Yo amo a Juan Querendón as Marely Cachón de la Cueva. In 2008,she portrayed the evil Mariela Fregoso in Juro que te amo and in the following year, played Elena Parra-Ibañez in Mar de Amor joining in 2010, the cast of Cuando me enamoro, substituting Wendy González in the role of Adriana Beltran.

In 2012, the producer Carlos Moreno Laguillo cast her in Amor Bravio as Natalia Ferrer Gutierrez. The same year, the producer Mapat called her to play a second "villain" role as María Laura Morales in La Mujer Del Vendaval.

In 2013, she announced she was temporarily removed from the world of acting because she wanted to devote time to her husband and family, with the La mujer del vendeval last participation in soap operas. In New Year 2014, January 9, she became the mother of a boy named Santiago.

In 2015 she returned to telenovelas, convened by the producer Carlos Moreno Laguillo for the soap opera A que no me dejas next to Camila Sodi, Osvaldo Benavides, Leticia Calderon and Arturo Peniche.

Filmography

Telenovelas

References

Mexican telenovela actresses
Living people
People from Hermosillo
1981 births
Actresses from Sonora
21st-century Mexican actresses